Crash Dive is a World War II film in Technicolor released in 1943. It was directed by Archie Mayo, written by Jo Swerling (from a story by W.R. Burnett), and starred Tyrone Power, Dana Andrews and Anne Baxter. The film was the last for Power before assignment to recruit training, as he had already enlisted in the United States Marine Corps.

Plot
US Navy submarine USS Corsair, operating in the North Atlantic, hunts out German merchant raiders preying on Allied shipping. Its new executive officer, Lt. Ward Stewart (Tyrone Power), has been transferred to submarines after commanding his own PT boat. At the submarine base in New London, Connecticut, he asks his new captain, Lieutenant Commander Dewey Connors (Dana Andrews), for a weekend leave to settle his affairs before taking up his new assignment. On a train bound for Washington D.C., Stewart accidentally encounters New London school teacher Jean Hewlett (Anne Baxter) and her students. Despite her initial resistance to his efforts, he charms her and they fall in love.

Stewart's infatuation with PT boats irritates Connors, but the two become friends after they engage a Q ship during which Connors is injured. Connors is in love with a woman called Jean, but delays marrying her until he gains a promotion to commander which would allow him to properly support her due to the pay raise it provides. Tension between the two men returns when Connors discovers that the woman Stewart is wooing is Jean. The film culminates in a commando raid by Corsair on an island supply base for the German raiders. The two men make peace after the raid, and Stewart and Jean are married once the Corsair returns to New London.

Cast
As appearing in screen credits (main roles identified):

Background
Part of the film was shot at Submarine Base New London, Connecticut.  are visible in the early part of the film. The PT boats seen near the beginning are the 77-foot Elco type. The submarine primarily featured as Corsair was the experimental , with a conning tower modified to resemble her sister . A few O-class and R-class submarines, built in World War I and used for training in World War II, are visible in the background of some shots. For wartime security reasons, no submarine classes used in combat in World War II appear in the film.  is seen in one shot; there are probably not many good Technicolor views of a four-stack destroyer available today. Semmes was being used as a sonar testbed at the time.

One of the scenes in the movie was similar to that in the film Destination Tokyo (1943) starring Cary Grant, where the submarines follow an enemy tanker into their naval base through a minefield. Another similar plot theme was in the 1954 movie Hell and High Water about an island base to be used to launch a Boeing B-29 Superfortress in U.S. markings for an atomic bomb attack.

One interesting feature of the film is the significant role of African-American actor Ben Carter as messman Oliver Cromwell Jones.  While most World War II movies (particularly those made during the war) feature few, if any, African-American characters, Crash Dive is a notable exception.  Although Carter plays a stereotypical role as a low ranking sailor, his character is more developed than most African-American characters of the time by being shown to be a confidant to a higher ranking crewmember. Jones (Ben Carter) also participates in a commando raid late in the film. A scene which subtly comments on the racial mores of the time depicts the white sailors blackening their faces in preparation for that nighttime raid. Upon walking in and seeing them Jones laughs then reports loudly "I'm the only born commando here!".

Awards
The film won the Academy Award for Best Visual Effects (Fred Sersen, Roger Heman Sr.) at the 16th Academy Awards.

References

External links
 
  
 
 

1943 films
1940s war films
American war drama films
American World War II films
1940s English-language films
Films directed by Archie Mayo
Films that won the Best Visual Effects Academy Award
World War II films made in wartime
World War II submarine films
Films scored by David Buttolph
Films with screenplays by Jo Swerling
20th Century Fox films
1943 drama films